Louis-Nicolas Brette Saint-Ernest (3 May 1802 – 10 March 1860) was a 19th-century French actor and playwright.

Biography 
A master study in Paris and assistant bricklayer, he began acting in 1829 before being hired in 1832 by the Théâtre de la Porte-Saint-Martin. He then played for the Théâtre de l'Ambigu-Comique from 1837 to 1852. He often appeared in the role of the father in many sentimental plays. 

Most of the time, his own plays that he signed Saint-Ernest, were presented at the Théâtre de l'Ambigu-Comique, of which he was managing director from 1848 to 1852. In 1852, he became dramaturge on the stage of the théâtre du Cirque, a position he still held when he died in 1860.

Works 

1832: Le naufrage de la Méduse
1834: Le juif errant
1835: Jeanne de Flandre
1837: Le corsaire noir
1837: L'honneur de ma mère
1837: Rose Ménard, ou Trop bonne mère, three-act drama, preceded by l'Aîné et le cadet, prologue in 1 act, with Auguste-Louis-Désiré Boulé
1838: Le chevalier du Temple
1838: Don Pèdre le mendiant, four-act drama, with Fabrice Labrousse
1838: L'élève de Saint-Cyr
1841: Jacques Coeur, l'argentier du roi
1842: Gaëtan il Mammone
1844: Jeanne, drama in 6 parts and 2 periods, with Boulé and Jules Chabot de Bouin
1845: Les mousquetaires
1845: Les talismans
1846: La closerie des genêts
1850: Notre Dame de Paris
1851: Henri le Lion, drama in 6 acts and 2 periods, with Eugène Fillot

Bibliography 
 Gustave Vapereau, Dictionnaire universel des contemporains, 1861, (p. 1545) 
 Henry Lyonnet, Dictionnaire des comédiens français, 1911, (p. 617)
 Claude Schopp, Le théâtre historique: Directeurs, décorateurs, musique, 2009, (p. 71)

19th-century French male actors
French male stage actors
19th-century French dramatists and playwrights
French theatre managers and producers
Actors from Orléans
1802 births
1860 deaths